The Captain Edward F. Ney Award for food-service excellence is given to the best US Navy galleys among those that earn a five-star rating from a Navy evaluation team.

The Secretary of the Navy and the International Food Service Executives Association (IFSEA) established the Capt. Edward F. Ney Memorial Awards Program in 1958. The award is designed to improve food-service operations and recognize the best general messes in the Navy.

Capt. Ney served as head of the Subsistence Division of the Bureau of Supplies and Accounts between 1940 and 1945.

After 1999, the Ney Awards are determined by a one-day, surprise inspection conducted by evaluation teams made up of senior Navy mess-management specialists and members of the IFSEA. Prior to that, the inspections were scheduled.

Mentions on ships
The food service motto on the USS Midway was "Every Day is a Ney Day", a reference to food service excellence and the Ney Memorial Award.   A poster of this can be seen in the kitchen at the USS Midway Museum.

References

Food and drink awards
Awards and decorations of the United States Navy
Awards established in 1958
1958 establishments in the United States